The canton of Héricourt-1 is an administrative division of the Haute-Saône department, northeastern France. It was created at the French canton reorganisation which came into effect in March 2015. Its seat is in Héricourt.

It consists of the following communes:
 
Brevilliers
Chagey
Châlonvillars
Champagney
Clairegoutte
Échavanne
Échenans-sous-Mont-Vaudois
Errevet
Frahier-et-Chatebier
Frédéric-Fontaine
Héricourt (partly)
Luze
Mandrevillars
Plancher-Bas
Plancher-les-Mines

References

Cantons of Haute-Saône